For crossings of the Hudson River, see:
List of fixed crossings of the Hudson River (bridges and tunnels)
List of ferries across the Hudson River to New York City